Orkhonsaikhany Bayarjavkhlan (born 4 May 1984) is a Mongolian international footballer. He has appeared twice for the Mongolia national football team.

References

1984 births
Mongolian footballers
Living people
Association football midfielders
Mongolia international footballers